Ma Yongfeng (born 28 November 1962) is a Chinese former shot putter who competed in the 1988 Summer Olympics.

References

1962 births
Living people
Chinese male shot putters
Olympic athletes of China
Athletes (track and field) at the 1988 Summer Olympics
Asian Games medalists in athletics (track and field)
Athletes (track and field) at the 1986 Asian Games
Athletes (track and field) at the 1990 Asian Games
Asian Games gold medalists for China
Asian Games silver medalists for China
Medalists at the 1986 Asian Games
Medalists at the 1990 Asian Games
20th-century Chinese people